The Annales de la Faculté des Sciences de Toulouse is a peer-reviewed scientific journal covering all fields of mathematics. Articles are written in English or French. It is published by the Institut de Mathématiques de Toulouse and edited with the help of the Centre de diffusion de revues académiques mathématiques. The editor-in-chief is Vincent Guedj (Université Paul Sabatier). The journal is abstracted and indexed in Zentralblatt MATH.

History 
The journal was established in 1887 by Marie Henri Andoyer, Benjamin Baillaud, G. Berson, T. Chauvin, E. Cosserat, A. Destrem, C. Fabre, A. Legoux, Paul Sabatier, and Thomas Joannes Stieltjes. Originally, the journal was multidisciplinary; the present version corresponds to the original "Mathematics" section.

References

External links 
 
 Online archive
 Print: 
 Online: 

Mathematics journals
Publications established in 1887
1887 establishments in France
Multilingual journals